Pullman F.C. was one of the dominant American soccer teams of the early twentieth century.  Established in 1893 as the Pullman Company team, it was an inaugural member of the Chicago League of Association Football before moving to the Association Football League.  It dominated the Peel Cup during the 1910s and early 1920s.

History
In 1893, the Pullman Company entered its newly created company soccer team as an inaugural member of the Chicago League of Association Football (CLAF).  Over the years, the Pullman Company sponsored numerous soccer teams, including teams for women, but the senior team remained in the CLAF for decades, competing for both the league championship, known as the Spalding Cup, and league cup, known as the Jackson Challenge Cup.  However, in 1883, Pullman F.C. gained with honor of playing the first official association football game in Chicago.  In 1904, a new Chicago league, the Association Football League, was created as a rival to the CLAF.  Pullman soon jumped leagues as the CLAF faded into obscurity to be replaced by the AFA as the city’s dominant league. In 1912, Pullman built a soccer stadium for its team at 104th and Corliss. In 1913, the AFA collapsed, but was quickly replaced by the Chicago and District League, better known as the Chicago Soccer League.  In 1917, Pullman disbanded its senior team.  In 1920, the team was re-established.  In the early twenties, Pullman moved to the Chicago Major Soccer League.  It disbanded permanently in 1929.

Year-by-year

Honors
Peel Cup
 Winner (8):  1912, 1913, 1914, 1915, 1921, 1923, 1925, 1926
 Runner Up (1): 1922

Jackson Cup (League Cup)
 Winner (2): 1912, 1913, 1914, 1915

League Championship
 Winner (5): 1912, 1913, 1914, 1915, 1916
 Runner Up (2): 1910, 1922

References

External links
 Encyclopedia of Chicago: Soccer
 Chicago Soccer History

Defunct soccer clubs in Illinois
Soccer clubs in Chicago
1893 establishments in Illinois
Pullman Company
Association football clubs established in 1893
1929 disestablishments in Illinois
Association football clubs disestablished in 1929